Cee-lo is a gambling game played with three six-sided dice.  There is not one standard set of rules, but there are some constants that hold true to all sets of rules. The name comes from the Chinese Sì-Wŭ-Liù (四五六), meaning "four-five-six". In America it is also called "See-Low," "Four-Five-Six," "The Three Dice Game," "Roll-off!," and by several alternative spellings, as well as simply "Dice." In China it is also called "Sān Liù Bàozi" (三六豹子), or "Three-Six Leopards". In Japan, it is known as "Chinchiro" (チンチロ) or "Chinchirorin" (チンチロリン).

The constants include the number of dice used, which is always three.  All rules describe certain winning combinations that can be rolled, and 4-5-6 is always treated as a winning combination for the first player who rolls it (though in some variants without a banker, it may be possible for several players to make a "winning combination," requiring a second shootout).  Besides the winning combinations, all Cee-lo rules include certain rolls that establish a "point," and there are situations where two or more players will roll and compare their points to determine a winner. If for any reason the dice were to leave the playing area (ex: rolling off of the table and hitting the floor) the player would be deemed an automatic loss.
 
The various sets of rules can be divided into two broad categories according to how betting is handled.  In banking games, one player serves as a banker, who covers the individual bets of the other players, each of whom competes directly with the bank.  In non-banking games, each player has essentially equal status, and rules must exist for the players to pool their bets and attempt to win from a common pot.

Origins and history 
In 1893, Stewart Culin reported that Cee-lo was the most popular dice game played by Chinese-Americans in San Francisco, CA. The game remains popular in American inner cities, but is more prominent in various New York City neighborhoods such as Harlem, Brownsville, Crown Heights, South Bronx, and Washington Heights. Whereas “street craps” remains popular in other American cities such as Los Angeles, Atlanta, Chicago, and parts of the south.  A deadly 2019 Brooklyn shooting was linked by police to a game of cee-lo.

Many hip hop artists have referenced the dice game "Cee-Lo" in rap songs since the 1990s. The references usually come from east coast rappers, including Kool G Rap, Big L, Jadakiss, Nas and Notorious B.I.G. as well as many other hip hop artists, and Cee-lo has seen a resurgence in popularity in American settings.  A 2003 Associated Press article presented by CBS News identified Cee-lo as a fad at schools in certain areas, "played for money even by preteens".

Rules 

Cee-lo can either be played with one central player (the bank) making individual bets with each other player, or as a winner-take-all game. The rules for play both with and without a bank are described below, including some common variants of each.

Casual players can still play the game "with a bank", as it includes rules that dictate when the duty of "being the bank" should pass to a new player.

Roll combinations

Cee-lo with a bank 
By definition, Cee-lo is a banking game, meaning that the players bet against an established banker, and it is a "point game", meaning that some dice rolls establish a point for the player (similar to the popular dice game craps).

In this game, one person is established as the banker, and all other players make even money bets against the bank. If a player makes a $10 bet, then they stand to either win or lose $10 depending on the roll of the dice. The Banker has an advantage relative to the other players (amounting to approximately 2.7% of the amount bet). When a player is established as the banker, they put up an initial stake known as the bank, or center bet. Once they have placed their stake, and announced the amount, the other players have a chance to cover or "fade" their bet. Starting with the player to the banker's left, and proceeding clockwise around the circle, each player in turn can fade a portion of the bank, as much as they like, until the entire bank is covered or every player has had a chance to make a bet.

If the initial stake is $100, the first player might choose to fade $20, the next player $20, and the next player $60. Then the entire bank is covered and no more bets are placed this round. Or, if the initial stake is $100, six players choose to fade $10 each, and no one else wishes to bet, then the banker pockets the unfaded portion of the bank ($40) and plays for only the stakes that were covered.

After all the bets are settled according to the roll of the dice (explained below), if the same player maintains control of the bank, he may add as much money as he wishes to his stake, or let the bank stand at whatever amount remains after all the bets are settled. A new round begins, the players fade again just as above, and so the game continues.

Control of the bank can change under certain circumstances. If all the players beat the banker in one round, they break the bank, and control of the bank then passes to the next player to the banker's left, who establishes his own initial stake as above. Otherwise, the first player to beat the banker by rolling 4-5-6 or triples will become the new banker (after the existing banker settles the remaining bets and pockets whatever remains of his bank).

The banker rolls the dice 
When all the bets have been established, the banker rolls the dice. There are four outcomes: automatic win, automatic loss, set point, re-roll

 Automatic Win: If the banker rolls 4-5-6, "triples" (all three dice show the same number), or a pair (of non-6s) with a 6 then they instantly win all bets. In Chinese these are called "4-5-6 straight kill" (四五六通杀), "leopards" (豹子 baozi), 
 Automatic Loss: If the banker rolls 1-2-3, or a pair (of non-1s) with a 1, they instantly lose all bets (the players break the bank). In Chinese this is "1-2-3 straight lose" (一二三通赔) and "asshole ones" (幺屁眼).
 Set Point: If the banker rolls a pair and a single (2, 3, 4, or 5), then the single becomes the banker's "point." E.g. a roll of 2-2-4 gives the banker a point of 4. Note that you can not set a point of 1 or 6, as those would result in an automatic loss or win, respectively (see above).
 Re-roll: If the dice don't show any of the above combinations, then the banker rolls again and keeps rolling until they get an instant win or an instant loss, or sets a point.

The players roll the dice 
If the banker does not roll an automatic win or loss, they will have rolled a point of 2, 3, 4, or 5. Each player then rolls the dice to settle his individual bet against the banker. The player wins with a 4–5–6, triple, or any point higher than the Banker's. They lose with a 1–2–3, or any point lower than the banker's. If they tie the banker's point, then it's a "push", no winner or loser, and the player pockets his stake. If they don't roll win, loss, or point, they continue to roll the dice until they do so.

The first player to win with a 4–5–6 or triple commonly gets the privilege of being the next banker after all the bets of this round are settled. It's also often the case that 4–5–6 pays double, triples pay three times, and triple 1s pay five times the wager, though different betting systems may be agreed upon.

Variations in rules for the banking game 
Some variants of Cee-lo have been described that reverse the rules of winning and losing rolls for the player who is not a banker, making a 1–2–3 a win for the player, and 4–5–6 a loss. If such a rule is followed to the extent that triples become a losing roll for the player, then this slightly increases the advantage to the banker.

Cee-lo without a bank (winner take all) 
In this version of the game, each round involves two or more players of equal status.  A bet amount is agreed upon and each player puts that amount in the pile or pot.  Each player then has to roll all three dice at once and must continue until a recognized combination is rolled.  Whichever player rolls the best combination wins the entire pot, and a new round begins.  In cases where two or more players tie for the best combination, they must have a shoot out to determine a single winner.

The combinations are similar to those described above, and can be ranked from best to worst as:

 4–5–6  The highest possible roll. If you roll 4–5–6, you automatically win.
 Trips  Rolling three same numbers is known as rolling a trip. Higher trips beat lower trips, so 4–4–4 is better than 3–3–3. Any trips beats any established point. 
 Point  Rolling a pair, and another number, establishes the singleton as a "point".  A higher point beats a lower point, so 2–2–6 is better than 5–5–2.
 1–2–3 The lowest possible roll. If you roll 1–2–3, you automatically lose. 

Any other roll is a meaningless combination and must be rerolled until one of the above combinations occurs.

Variants 
Some players rule that a 4-5-6 is an instant win for the first player who rolls it, and it cannot be tied. To see who picks the order, each person rolls a die and the person with the highest number chooses the order. If it is a tie, then those people roll again and again until one person has a higher number. Other rules allow for a 4-5-6 to be tied, which may be referred to as "catch up" rules but this is usually not the case.   

Some non-banking games treat 1-1-1 as a losing roll, and may refer to this as an "ace out".

One variant rules that if a player wins with "trips" or 4-5-6, all players must pay double the original bet. This is known as "doubling down".

Some players designate a limited surface where players can roll, instead of throwing the dice off a wall, such as a table or a cardboard box. If the dice roll off the surface, it is called a "loose roll" or "sloppy dice," resulting in an automatic loss for the player.

Some rule that if a player rolls the dice 3 times without getting a meaningful combination, they are out.

One variation assigns a point based on the pair rolled, rather than the singleton; i.e., a 5-5-2 gives a five (also known by various slang terms such as "fevers"), which beats a 3-3-6 three (a.k.a. "treys").

A variation described as a "West Coast Version" ranks the combinations somewhat differently.  It ranks pairs according to the highest pair, ignoring the singleton (as described immediately above), then treats all "trips" as an instant loss.  1-2-3 is treated as just another meaningless roll.

Another variant treats triples as "high points" and doubles as "low points" (which are set in the traditional way). In this variant a "low six", e.g. 2-2-6, beats a "high five," 5-5-5, but a "high five", 5-5-5 beats a "low five", e.g. 3-3-5, and so on with other points

In a two player game, dealer/player who rolls a "1" on the odd die is considered to have been "aced out", losing automatically. If the odd die is a "6", "trips", or "head crack", the player wins automatically.

A variant of Cee-lo has been sold under the name Chinchirorin.  According to the rules of this game, Chinchirorin is a traditional Japanese game. Mainly played by older people in Japan, the game is reportedly gaining in popularity as a gambling game in that country.

Probabilities
With three six-sided dice there are (6×6×6=) 216 possible permutations.

4-5-6: 6/216 = 2.78% (Automatic Win)
Trips: 6/216 = 2.78%
Point: 90/216 = 41.67%
1-2-3: 6/216 = 2.78% (Automatic Loss)
Meaningless permutations: 108/216 = 50%

See also 
 Sic bo - an ancient Chinese game of chance played with three dice

References

External links 
dice-play: The Three Dice Game
BoardGameGeek description of Chinchirorin
Early description of the game
Brownsville's rapper Ka talking about playing Cee-Lo in his hood

Dice games
Gambling games
Japanese games
Chinese games